WLOU (1350 AM) is a radio station  broadcasting an urban oldies music format. Licensed to Louisville, Kentucky, United States, the station serves the Louisville, KY-IN market area. Its studios are located west of downtown and the transmitter is on the city's westside near I-264. WLOU utilizes an FM translator: W284AD 104.7 FM covering most urban parts of Louisville and the southern Indiana suburbs of New Albany, Clarksville, and Jeffersonville. The Louisville, KY-IN radio market has approximately 200,000 African-American citizens, 170,000 aged 6+ years.

Heritage
WLOU is the heritage African-American oriented station in Louisville, programming to that community continuously since October 21, 1951. The early conversion to Rhythm & Blues makes WLOU one of the first five full-time R&B stations in the USA. The station featured the popular R&B format for decades and, despite being an AM stand-alone daytime station, was one of the nation's top-rated R&B-Soul/Black Radio outlets. On November 21, 1957, WLOU went from 1,000 watts to 5,000 watts daytime with a pre-sunrise 6 am-local radio sunrise power of 500 watts. Nighttime service of 500 watts directional began March 8, 1984.

History
In 1951, WLOU became one of the country's first "Negro radio stations" to use black disc jockeys

After WGZB-FM and WMJM eclipsed WLOU's dominance in the 1990s, it took on the urban gospel format on July 15, 1996, after a brief period of airing a Christian talk format. Some of the classic R&B announcers at WLOU in the earlier years include William "Tobe" Howard, "Jockey Jack" Gibson, Cliff Butler, William Summers, III (who later became President & Managing Partner of WLOU and then-sister WSTM-FM in the 1970s), Larry Dean, Otis "Daddy Dee" Humphrey, Winston "Skip" Thompson, "Little David" Anderson, Betty "Louise Jefferson" Rowan, Jerry Tucker and James "Jim Dandy" Rucker. Popular later announcers include Jim Williams, Neal O'Rea, Brenda "20th Century Fox" Banks, Tony Fields, Bill Price (currently WLOU/WLLV General Manager) and Ange Canessa, through the end of the Urban Contemporary/Hip-Hop Format on October 31, 1995.

The station had been owned by Anchor Radio, LLC since 2011. In late 2011, Anchor Radio, LLC acquired two synchronous FM translators on 104.7 MHz W284AD New Albany, Indiana and W284AM Middletown, Kentucky and began simulcasting WLOU using the slogan "WLOU on FM." Occasionally, WLOU simulcast with sister station WLLV.

Effective March 15, 2020, Anchor Radio sold WLOU, WLLV, and W284AD to New Albany Broadcasting for $325,000.

On August 7, 2020, WLOU changed their format from urban gospel to urban oldies.

Awards
In January 2012, the station was recognized as the Medium Market Station of the Year at the 2012 Stellar Awards ceremony in Nashville, Tennessee.

Previous logo

References

External links

FCC History Cards for WLOU

LOU
Radio stations established in 1948
Urban oldies radio stations in the United States
1948 establishments in Kentucky